Glassboro is an inactive train station in Glassboro, New Jersey which served passengers from 1863–1971. Its station house was restored . It is located at the edge of the Rowan University campus. Listed as the West Jersey Rail Road Glassboro Depot, it was added to the National Register of Historic Places on April 14, 2020, for its significance in architecture and transportation.

History

The West Jersey Railroad (WJ) was granted its charter by the state on February 5, 1853, to build a line from Camden to Cape May. The line was built with the backing of the Camden and Amboy Railroad from Camden to Glassboro, with the first 8.2 miles of the line using the abandoned ROW built by the Camden and Woodbury Railroad to Woodbury.

The  Millville and Glassboro Railroad (M&G) was built by a group of Millville businessmen independently of the West Jersey Railroad. Chartered on March 9, 1859, and incorporated in March 1859, the M&G was completed and opened in October 1860.

In 1896 the Pennsylvania Railroad (PRR) consolidated all its railroads and several smaller properties in southern New Jersey into the West Jersey and Seashore Railroad (WJ&S). In 1932, the PRR and Reading Company (RDG) merged their southern New Jersey railroad lines into one company, the Pennsylvania-Reading Seashore Lines (PRSL). The line was electrified between 1906–1949. In 1968 New York Central Railroad was merged into the PRR becoming Penn Central, which was bankrupt by 1970. The last passenger train ran in 1971.

The line came under the auspices of Conrail. Following the purchase and division of Conrail it was designated part of the South Jersey/Philadelphia Shared Assets Area. Known as the Vineland Secondary it is owned, operated and maintained by Conrail for the exclusive benefit of CSX Transportation and Norfolk Southern Railway. The Vineland Secondary begins at Pavonia Yard in Camden and heads south. It has a spur serving the Port of Camden. It continues another  to Millville.

Restoration of station building
The station house was renovated in 2015. It is part of the  Millville and Glassboro Railroad Historic District (ID#4153), recognized by the New Jersey' Office of Historic Preservation.

Glassboro-Camden Line
A new station at Rowan University in the vicinity of the historic depot is the planned for the proposed Glassboro–Camden Line, an  diesel multiple unit (DMU) light rail system. The terminal Glassboro station, planned for Ellis Street, is one stop further at Main and High streets.

See also
Operating Passenger Railroad Stations Thematic Resource (New Jersey)
National Register of Historic Places listings in Gloucester County, New Jersey

References 

Glassboro, New Jersey
Former Pennsylvania-Reading Seashore Lines stations
Railway stations in Gloucester County, New Jersey
Former railway stations in New Jersey
Railway stations closed in 1971
1860 establishments in New Jersey
Railway stations in the United States opened in 1860
Proposed NJ Transit rail stations
1971 disestablishments in New Jersey
Railway stations on the National Register of Historic Places in New Jersey
National Register of Historic Places in Gloucester County, New Jersey